Little Grassy Lake may refer to:

 Little Grassy Lake (Illinois)
 Little Grassy Lake (Florida)